First encirclement campaign refers to several different encirclement campaigns launched by the Nationalist Government with the goal of destroying the developing Chinese Red Army and its communist bases in several separate locations in China during the early stage of Chinese Civil War between the late 1920s to mid-1930s, and these are:

First encirclement campaign against the Jiangxi Soviet, November 1930 to January 3, 1931
First encirclement campaign against the Hubei–Henan–Anhui Soviet, November 1930 to March 9, 1931
First encirclement campaign against the Honghu Soviet, early December 1930 to the end of January 1931
First encirclement campaign against the Hubei–Henan–Shaanxi Soviet, January to February 5, 1935
First encirclement campaign against the Shaanxi–Gansu Soviet, March 1934 to August 26, 1934